The 2015 West Lancashire Borough Council election took place on 7 May 2015, to elect members of  West Lancashire Borough Council in Lancashire, England. One third of the council participated in the election. The UK general election was also on 7 May 2015.

Results

Ashurst

Aughton and Downholland

Aughton Park

Bickerstaffe

Birch Green

Derby

Digmoor

Knowsley

North Meols

Parbold

Scarisbrick

Scott

Skelmersdale North

Skelmersdale South

Tanhouse

Tarleton

Up Holland

Wrightington

References

2015 English local elections
May 2015 events in the United Kingdom
2015
2010s in Lancashire